William Blackwell (born January 24, 1989) is a former college football player.

College career
He was a prominent guard for the LSU Tigers of Louisiana State University. In 2011, Blackwell was selected an All-American by The Sporting News and was a consensus All-Southeastern Conference selection.

Professional career
Blackwell was signed as an undrafted free agent by the Carolina Panthers of the National Football League (NFL) but was cut during the preseason.

References

External links
 LSU Tigers bio

1989 births
Players of American football from Louisiana
Living people
American football offensive guards
All-American college football players
LSU Tigers football players
People from West Monroe, Louisiana